Syrianarpia mendicalis is a species of moth in the family Crambidae. It is found in Ukraine (the Crimea), Turkey and Iran.

References

Moths described in 1879
Scopariinae
Insects of Turkey